Yun Zi is a male giant panda born at the San Diego Zoo on August 5, 2009.  His name is "Son of Cloud (Yun)" in Chinese.

Yun Zi weighed 4 ounces at birth. He was the fifth cub born to his mother Bai Yun, and the fourth to his father Gao Gao. He has one half-sister, Hua Mei, through Bai Yun. He also has two full brothers, Mei Sheng and Xiao Liwu, and two full sisters, Su Lin and Zhen Zhen. Like his full siblings, he was conceived via natural mating.  The name was selected from a list of 6,300 names submitted by his fans. He received his name on November 17, 2009 at 104 days of age.

Yun Zi made his public debut on January 7, 2010, at 155 days of age. He was weaned in February 2011.

Yun Zi returned to China in January 2014. He resides at Duijiangyan Base (part of the China Conservation and Research Centre for Giant Pandas).

References

External links
 San Diego Giant Panda Research Center
 Panda Fix

Individual giant pandas
2009 animal births
San Diego Zoo